Marcelo Ceballos (born 19 January 1972) is a retired Argentine football striker.

References

1972 births
Living people
Argentine footballers
A.D. Berazategui footballers
Club Atlético Villa San Carlos footballers
Club Atlético Ciclón players
Guabirá players
Barracas Central players
The Strongest players
Club Blooming players
Club San José players
Carabobo F.C. players
Unión Tarija players
Libertad de Sunchales footballers
Talleres de Perico footballers
Gimnasia y Esgrima de Mendoza footballers
Bolivian Primera División players
Association football forwards
Argentine expatriate footballers
Expatriate footballers in Bolivia
Argentine expatriate sportspeople in Bolivia
Expatriate footballers in Venezuela
Argentine expatriate sportspeople in Venezuela
People from Berazategui Partido
Sportspeople from Buenos Aires Province